The Kech River flows in the Makran region, of southeastern Iran and the southwestern area of Balochistan Province in southwestern Pakistan.

Geography
The seasonal intermittent river is a tributary of the Dasht River. The Dasht flows southeast into the Central Makran Range in the Gwadar District of Balochistan, and to its mouth at the Gulf of Oman of the Arabian Sea.

Uses
The city of Turbat is located on the Kech River. The river's water is used to irrigate orchards and for vegetable farming in surrounding areas.

Flooding
The area is prone to flooding by the Kech River. In June 2007 the flood waters entered the city of Turbat after the river burst it banks, and thousands were affected.  The downstream Mirani Dam on the Dasht River was endangered.

Archaeology
Kech-Makran culture flourished in the Kech River Valley in protohistoric times as early as the fifth millennium BC. There were numerous settlements in this area, including Balakot, Makran.

See also
Geography of Balochistan, Pakistan 
Makran

References

External links
 Kech River|OpenStreetMap

Rivers of Iran
Gwadar District
Rivers of Balochistan (Pakistan)
Rivers of Pakistan

simple:List of rivers of Pakistan#Other rivers